The Guadalmedina (from the Arabic) is a river that runs through the city of Málaga, Spain. Historically, it has played an important role in the city's history, and has divided the city into two halves.  The city's historic center is on its left bank.

Course
It reaches the Mediterranean in the center of the city of Málaga and flows through the Montes de Málaga Natural Park.

It is a river subject to high seasonal variations and  has five well defined tributaries which have their sources in the Montes de Málaga range, the Arroyo de las Vacas,  Arroyo Chaperas,  Arroyo Humaina, Arroyo Hondo and  Arroyo de Los Frailes. All of these rivers are dry most of the year. The Limonero Dam on the Guadalmedina provides water for the area.

See also 
 List of rivers of Spain

References

Rivers of Spain
Rivers of Andalusia